Mattia Bellini (born 8 February 1994) is an Italian rugby union player. His position is on the wing and he currently plays for Benetton in United Rugby Championship.

In September 2015, Bellini played with Zebre in Pro12, like permit player.

He previously played for Petrarca. He played with Zebre from 2016 to April 2022.

In 2014 Bellini was named in the Italy Under 20 squad and in 2014 and 2015 he was also named in the Italy Sevens squad.

Bellini was named in the Italian squad for the 2016 Six Nations Championship. He made his debut on 6 February against France On 18 August 2019, he was named in the final 31-man squad for the 2019 Rugby World Cup.	
Filippo Drago (rugby union)

References

External links

1994 births
Living people
Italian rugby union players
Italy international rugby union players
Petrarca Rugby players
Zebre Parma players
Sportspeople from Padua
Rugby union wings
Benetton Rugby players